Raimund Faltz (1658-1703) was a medallist active in Germany. Faltz was born in Stockholm, studied under medallist Charles-Jean-François Chéron in Paris, and in 1688 moved to Berlin where he made a large number of medals and reliefs until his death.

References 
 Staats- und Gesellschafts-Lexikon: neues Conversations-Lexikon : in Verbindung mit deutschen Gelehrten und Staatsmännern, Volume 13, Friedrich Wilhelm Hermann Wagener, Berlin, 1863, page 146.
 Conversationslexicon für bildende Kunst, Volume 3, J. A. Romberg (editor), Leipzig, 1846, page 408.
 Handbook of the Arts of the Middle Ages and Renaissance: As Applied to the Decoration of Furniture, Arms, Jewels, &c. &c, Charles Jules Labarte, John Murray, 1855, page 35.

German medallists